Squeak the Mouse is an Italian black comedy comic strip and later comic book created by artist Massimo Mattioli. The comic depicts attempts by its title character, the anthropomorphic Squeak the Mouse, to outwit a cat who is chasing him. The comic satirizes cartoon series such as Tom and Jerry, taking the content to extreme levels, which includes gory horror violence and explicit sexual content.

Two issues of a Squeak the Mouse comic book were produced in 1984 and 1992, the first written from the perspective of the cat, who murders the title character, and the second, written from the perspective of Squeak, who murders the cat. Each issue features a zombie plotline and a pornographic section depicting one of the main characters in an orgy with several funny animal women. On April 18, 2019, a third issue was published on a new collection titled Squeak the Mouse: The Trilogy.

Overview 
Squeak the Mouse is a parody of the cartoon series, Tom and Jerry. Although the style of the drawing is typical of children comics, Squeak indulges in graphic violent, gore, splatter and pornographic scenes.

The first issue of the series is written from the perspective of the cat, who is aggravated by Squeak the Mouse, and ultimately murders the title character. The cat goes to a party and unsuccessfully attempts to have sex with his girlfriend, and instead sleeps with another girl he meets at the party, Squeak the Mouse returns from the dead as a zombie and murders every one of the guests at the party, until the cat stops the mouse by murdering it with a blender. When the cat returns home, each of the party guests, revived as zombies, attempt to kill him, leading him to kill each of the undead in self-defense. The next day, the cat engages in an orgy with a number of beautiful women, but Squeak the Mouse returns once more and slaughters each of the women, leading the cat to kill Squeak once more before chasing after another mouse. The end of the issue assures readers that Squeak is really dead and will not return.

The second issue, Squeak the Mouse 2, begins with a duck who revives Squeak from the pages of the first Squeak the Mouse comic book. Squeak proceeds to read his own comic, and is horrified by his own murder, and decides to track down the cat and murder him. However, when Squeak confronts the cat at a screening of The Texas Chainsaw Massacre 2, the cat tricks Squeak into feeling sympathy for him, which allows the cat to briefly escape before being murdered by the mouse. As Squeak boards a plane heading to a tropical island, the cat returns as a zombie and crashes the plane, killing all of the passengers except Squeak, who escapes, and swims to the nearest island, where a pair of women awaken him by performing oral sex on Squeak, leading to another orgy sequence. The cat turns up on the island and slaughters the women, and Squeak destroys the cat, leaving only its separated bones, which are found by a horror film-loving child, who brings the remains home and reassembles them. The skeleton cat slaughters the child and his family, and once again goes after Squeak, who finally gets rid of the cat for good, but decides to antagonize another cat.

Publication history 
The comic was first published in the underground comics magazine Frigidaire starting from 1982. The stories were later collected in an eponymous volume in 1984 by Éditions Albin Michel and it was initially intended to be an ended series. It had a sequel (Squeak the Mouse 2) published in 1992 also by Éditions Albin Michel and Sefam, Paris. Fantagraphics released all of the stories in a collection on April 12, 2022.

Controversy 
On August 1, 1985, New York harbor officials confiscated the comic publication on the grounds that it was pornographic, but a court later overturned that decision. According to Bernd Metz of Catalan Communications, the book's USA publisher, Squeak the Mouse was ruled not obscene "because it failed the third test of the law... the Miller test as it's called... in that it did not exceed the community standards."

Legacy 
The comics are considered to be an apparent inspiration for Matt Groening's The Itchy & Scratchy Show.

See also 
 The Itchy & Scratchy Show
 Happy Tree Friends
 Tom and Jerry

References 

1982 comics debuts
1992 comics endings
Italian comics titles
Italian comics characters
Black comedy comics
Horror comics
Satirical comics
Pantomime comics
Parody comics
Humor comics
Erotic comics
Obscenity controversies in comics
Parodies of films
Parodies of television shows
Anthropomorphic cats
Anthropomorphic mice and rats
Comics about cats
Comics about mice and rats
Zombies in comics
Comics about death
Underground comix
Comics characters introduced in 1982